Michael Mortensen and Mats Wilander were the defending champions, but Mortensen did not participate this year.  Wilander partnered Joakim Nyström, withdrawing prior to their quarterfinal match.

Sergio Casal and Emilio Sánchez won the title, defeating Carlos Kirmayr and Cássio Motta 6–4, 4–6, 7–5 in the final.

Seeds

  Joakim Nyström /  Mats Wilander (quarterfinals, withdrew)
  Heinz Günthardt /  Balázs Taróczy (semifinals)
  Pavel Složil /  Tomáš Šmíd (first round)
  Sergio Casal /  Emilio Sánchez (champions)

Draw

Draw

References
Draw

1985 in Swiss sport
1985 Grand Prix (tennis)
1985 Geneva Open